The  is a Kofun period burial mound located in the Himeogawa neighborhood of the city of Anjō, Aichi in the Tōkai region of Japan. The tumulus was designated as a National Historic Site  in 1927.

Overview
The Himeogawa Kofun is located on the eastern edge of the Hekikai Plateau facing the alluvial lowland of the west bank of the Yahagi River at an elevation of 12.5 meters, but protruding only four meters above the surrounding rice paddies. It has an overall length is 66 meters, with a 44-meter diameter posterior circular portion with a height of seven meters. This circular portion is surmounted with an Asama Jinja Shinto shrine. The anterior rectangular portion has a length of 27 meters and width of 31.5 meters with a height of two meters. The tumulus is in an area with a dense concentration of kofun, known as the Sakurai Kofun cluster, and includes the Futago Kofun. 

As a result of an archaeological excavation in 2016, it was found that the anterior portion was closer to trapezoidal rather than rectangular as originally assumed, with changes to the terrain caused by landfill in the Edo period and after World War II. The same survey found traces of moats on the west and north sides, but for unknown reasons the moats did not extend to the south side. The tumulus was originally covered in fukiishi stones, but appeared to be earth-fill with no stone burial chamber.  This appears to be a characteristic of the kofun in the Sakurai Kofun group, rather than an indication of age, as some haniwa fragments were also discovered. The tumulus has been dated to the late third century AD.

The tumulus is located about 15 minutes on foot from Sakurai Station on the Meitetsu Nishio Line.

Total length 66.0 meters:
Anterior rectangular portion 27 meters long x 31.5 meters wide x 2.0 meters high
Constriction width 19.0 meters 
Posterior circular portion 44.0 meter diameter x 7.5 meters high

See also
List of Historic Sites of Japan (Aichi)

References

External links
Anjo city home page 
Anjo City Museum of History 

History of Aichi Prefecture
Anjō, Aichi
Historic Sites of Japan
Archaeological sites in Japan
Kofun